Carex macrosolen is a tussock-forming species of perennial sedge in the family Cyperaceae. It is native to southern parts of South America..

It was first described by the botanist Ernst Gottlieb von Steudel in 1855 as a part of the work Synopsis plantarum glumacearum. The only synonym is  Carex macrocarpa.

See also
List of Carex species

References

macrosolen
Plants described in 1855
Taxa named by Ernst Gottlieb von Steudel
Flora of Argentina
Flora of Chile